The Police, Fire and Crime Commissioner for Northamptonshire (Fire and Rescue Authority) Order 2018 is a statutory instrument ordered by the Secretary of State to transfer responsibility for the governance of the fire and rescue services from Northamptonshire County Council (NCC) to the Police and Crime Commissioner (PCC). The PCC will then be known as the Police, Fire and Crime Commissioner (PFCC) for Northamptonshire.

References

Emergency services in England
Statutory Instruments of the United Kingdom
Northamptonshire